Fager is a surname. Notable people with the surname include: 

Anders Fager (born 1964), Swedish author
August Fager (1891–1967), American sportsman
Chuck Fager (born 1942), American activist
Jeff Fager (born 1954), American media executive
Jonas Fager (born 1969), Swedish sportsman

See also
Dr. Fager (1964–1976), American thoroughbred racehorse
Dr. Fager Stakes, a horserace in Florida